Lundbreen is a glacier in Nathorst Land at Spitsbergen, Svalbard. It has a length of about four kilometers, extending from Juvtinden to Kvitskarvbreen, beside the mountain of Langlifjellet. The glacier is named after civil servant Egil Lund.

From 300 AD to 1500 AD, Lundbreen was used as a mountain pass. In the 2010s, artifacts from up to 2,000 years ago were found here, because of melting in the area. However, most of the items date from 300 to 1500 A.D.

References

Glaciers of Spitsbergen